Barry Yates (born January 30, 1946) is an American former professional basketball player. He played for the Philadelphia 76ers in 24 games during the 1971–72 NBA season. He declared for the NBA draft after his sophomore season at the University of Maryland.

References

1946 births
Living people
American men's basketball players
Basketball players from Iowa
Maryland Terrapins men's basketball players
Philadelphia 76ers draft picks
Philadelphia 76ers players
Power forwards (basketball)
People from Fremont County, Iowa